Peter A. Musñgi, also known as Peter Rabbit, is a Filipino voice over artist, radio DJ and news anchor, best known as the current voice-over artist for the media company ABS-CBN.

Education
Musñgi finished his last two years of high school at La Sallete Seminary in Isabela. Musñgi graduated from the University of the East with a degree in business administration, major in accounting, in 1972. A year later, he passed the CPA Board Exam. At the Ateneo de Manila University, he earned his Master of Business Administration degree.

Career
As a high school student, Musñgi served as a DJ for a local pop radio station where a relative was the manager. Following his stint as a radio personality, he was tapped to provide voice as announcer in commercials and film trailers.

He became known to the wider public when he accidentally sang the nursery rhyme, "Little Peter Rabbit" over the radio which caught the attention of actress and radio personality, Helen Vela. This performance led to Musñgi being dubbed as “Peter Rabbit”.

Musñgi first joined ABS-CBN in 1972, as an announcer for its radio station 101.0 DZYK FM, learning how to play a prepared and approved list of songs as well as doing time check and voiceovers for the station ID. He was one of many unemployed after ABS-CBN was shut down following the declaration of Martial Law by  President Ferdinand Marcos on 23 September 1972. He later worked for various other AM radio stations.

When the People Power Revolution overthrew President Marcos in 1986, Musñgi rejoined ABS-CBN. He became the main voice-over of the company's television network since then. From 1988 to 1994, he was also station manager of DZMM and DWRR. He is a key person in the media conglomerate's Manila Radio Division and ABS-CBN Sports.

Style
In his childhood, Musñgi had already developed an interest in creating his own voice. He said that in his home province, there were no television yet and he would often listen to the radio. Musñgi said that he initially imitated the voices he heard on the radio before developing his own voice-over style. He also read newspapers aloud as part of honing his voice. He has once cited Joonee Gamboa as one of his inspirations in developing his own style.

Filmography

Radio
Teka Muna "Co-host with Pat-P Daza" (DZMM, 2013–2018)
Pasada Sais Trenta "Co-host with Pat-P Daza" (DZMM, October 15, 2018 – May 5, 2020)

Television
Pasada sa TeleRadyo "Co-host with Rica Lazo" (TeleRadyo, November 16, 2020 – present)

References

1945 births
Living people
Filipino male voice actors
Filipino radio personalities
Filipino television personalities
Ateneo de Manila University alumni
University of the East alumni
ABS-CBN people